The Stanford Mausoleum, located in the Northwest of the Stanford University campus in the Stanford University Arboretum, holds the remains of the university's namesake Leland Stanford, Jr. and his parents Leland and Jane Stanford.

Once per year, the mausoleum is opened to the public and a wreath laid (usually in October during the reunion weekend) as part of the annual Founders' Day activities.

History
The original intent of the Stanfords was to build a family mansion here.  They had only gotten as far as planting a cactus garden (still present) before the death of their only son.  They changed their plans to building a university in his name instead.  Nearby is a memorial (the Angel of Grief) to Jane Stanford's brother, Henry Clay Lathrop.  This memorial is a 1908 copy of a 1901 copy of an 1894 statue by the prominent American sculptor William Wetmore Story.

Appearance
The mausoleum has sphinxes on both the front and the back.  The back ones are Greek and female with naked breasts.  They were originally on the front but the Stanfords disapproved of them and replaced them with Egyptian style male sphinxes and moved the female sphinxes to the back.

Halloween Mausoleum Party

Stanford Mausoleum is also the site of the traditional Mausoleum Party, informally referred to as Maus, a  student Halloween party held each year at 10:00pm on the last Friday or Saturday of October. After being temporarily cancelled from 2002 to 2005, this tradition was revived in 2006. It is sponsored and planned annually by the Stanford Sophomore Class.

References

External links 

 
 Virtual Reality of Stanford Mausoleum, a QuickTime panorama by Erik Goetze
 Stanford Mausoleum at Stanford Buildings & Ground Maintenance
 Founders' Celebration, by Stanford University, with information about the annual opening to the public of the Mausoleum 

Buildings and structures in Palo Alto, California
Mausoleums in the United States
Mausoleum
Monuments and memorials in California
Death in California
Halloween